Mordellistena ghanii is a beetle in the genus Mordellistena of the family Mordellidae. It was described in 1974 by Franciscolo.

References

ghanii
Beetles described in 1974